Pwa Saw of Thitmahti (or ) was the chief queen consort of King Kyawswa, and of King Saw Hnit of the Pagan Dynasty of Burma (Myanmar). The royal chronicles identify Saw Soe as the chief queen of Kyawswa but historians identify her as the chief queen. She was the mother of Crown Prince Theingapati and Kumara Kassapa.

Thitmahti was one of the three historical Pagan period queens known by the epithet of Pwa Saw (lit. "Queen Grandmother", or queen dowager). According to an analysis of the contemporary stone inscriptions by Ba Shin, she was a younger sister of Queen Saw Hla Wun, and she may have succeeded her sister as the chief queen only in 1295/96. But not everyone accepts that Hla Wun was a queen of Kyawswa, two decades her junior, or that Thitmahti was a sister of Hla Wun.

Notes

References

Bibliography
 
 
 

Chief queens consort of Pagan
13th-century Burmese women
14th-century Burmese women